Bunaea vulpes is a species of large emperor moth found in Madagascar.

References 

Moths of Madagascar